Chatkhil is an upazila of Noakhali District in the Division of Chittagong, Bangladesh. It is bounded by Laksham and Shahrasti Upazila on the north, Lakshmipur Sadar Upazila on the south, Begumganj Upazila on the east, and Ramgonj Upazila on the west. Chatkhil thana was formed in 1977 and was upgraded into an upazila in 1983.

Geography 
It has 46,044 household units and a total area 133.89 km2.

Demographics 
As of the 2011 Bangladesh census, Chatkhil had a population of 233,075. Males constituted 48.43% of the population, and females 51.57%. The population aged 18 and up was 90,484. The average literacy rate was 52.1% (7+ years), and the national average was 32.4% literate. The town is now a municipality with an area of 6.07 km2 and population 28817; male 48.45%, female 51.55%. It has 9 wards and 18 mahallas. Literacy rate among the town people is 54.8%.

Administration 
Chatkhil police station was established in 1977 and was turned into an Upazila in 1983.

Chatkhil Upazila is divided into Chatkhil Municipality and nine union parishads: Badalkot, Hat Pukuriaghatlabag, Khilpara, Mohammadpur, Noakhala, Panchgaon, Porokote, Ramnarayanp, and Sahapur. The union parishads are subdivided into 108 mauzas and 129 villages.

Chatkhil Municipality is subdivided into 9 wards and 16 mahallas.

The hub of the Upazila is Bhimmpur village which consists of Chatkhil Bazar and the administration office of Chatkhil Upazila

Education
Colleges : There are 4 colleges in this area: 

 Chatkhil Panchgaon Mahbub Govt. College
 Chatkhil Women's College, 
 Sompara College, 
 Abdul Wahab Degree College, Chatkhil, Noakhali.

High Schools: Chatkhil Panchgaon Govt. High School,

Chatkhil Govt. Girls High School,

Shahapur M.L High School

Khilpara M.L. High School,

Vimpur M. L. High School,

Gomatoli Shamsul Huda High School, 

Soptogaon Hifh School, 

Taltala Adarsha High Schoo, 

Singbahura Girls Academy, 

Jib Nagar High School, 

Karihati High School. Chatkhil, Noakhali.

Govt. Primary Schools : 
Reg. Primary School : Shahapur Govt. primary School, 
Lamchory Govt. Primary School, 
Madrasha : Dakkhin Deliai Hashemia Dakhil Madrasha, Chatkhil Kamil Madrasha, Sadhurkhil AI Fazil Madrasha, Molliker Dighirpar Fazil Madrasha, RuhitKhali Govt. Primary School, RuhitKhali Mohila Dakhil Madrasha

Narayan Pur R.K High School
Kamalpur Mohammed Hashem High School
Sholla Government Primary School  
Saptagaon Adarsha High School
Porokot Dasgharia Union High school
Chatkhil Panch Gaon Government High School
Chatkhil Mahbub Government College
Chatkhil Mohila College
Palla Mahbub Adarsha High School
Badalkote High School
Hirapur Ideal High School
Hirapur Islamia Kamil Madrasha
Bhimpur High School
Chatkhil Kamil Madrasha
Abdul Wahab College
Hatpukuria High School
Jib Nagar High School
Shahapur M.L High School
Khilpara M L High School
Molliker Dighirpar High School
Badalkote High School
Molliker Dighirpar Fazil Madrasha
Sadhurkhil A I Fazil Madrasha
Chatkhil Kamil Madrasha
Sompara High School
Proshadpur Government Primary School
Khowazer Vithee Sr. Fazil Madrasha
Horipur Government Primary School
Faorah High School
Faorah Government Primary School
Mirjapur Muktijoddah Abdur Rahim High School
Madhubpur Government primary School
Ramnarayan pur. High School
Kalyannagar Government primary School
Omar Ali High School
Mother Shade Academy (Shadurkhil)
Mother Shade Academy (Khorihati)
Mother shade Academy (Taltola)
Shadurkhil Government Primary school
Chatkhil Girls School
 Horipur Al-Nur Hafijia Madrasa

Madrasha:
Jamia osmania chatkhil
Madhubpur Darul-Ulm Nurani & Hafizia Madrasha

Notable residents
 Shirin Sharmin Chaudhury- speaker of the Bangladesh parliament
 Munier Choudhury, Bangladeshi educator, playwright, literary critic and political dissident. He was a victim of the mass killing of Bengali intellectuals in 1971
 Kabir Chowdhury, was an academic, essayist, materialist, translator, cultural worker, civil society activist in Bangladesh
 Muhammed Abul Manzur, military general
 Ferdousi Mazumder, actress
 Habibur Rahman, educationist and professor
 Rubi Rahman, poet and politician

See also
Dhannapur, a village in Chatkhil

References 

Chatkhil Upazila